Sect of Vile Divinities is the eleventh full-length studio album by the American death metal band Incantation. The album was released on August 21, 2020 through Relapse Records.

Critical reception

The album received generally positive reviews from music critics.

Recording
The album was recorded at Incantation Studios. Engineering was done by Dave Piatek at Recording Services, and by Matthew "Zilla" Draudt, John McEntee and Kyle Severn at Severn Studios. Additional tracking was done by Jamie King Audio, Winston, Winston Salem, North Carolina. Mixing and mastering was done by Dan Swanö at Unisound Studios.

Track listing

Charts

Personnel 
All information is derived from the enclosed booklet.

Incantation 
 John McEntee – vocals, rhythm guitar, engineering
 Sonny Lombadozzi – lead guitar
 Chuck Sherwood – bass
 Kyle Severn – drums, engineering

Additional personnel 
 Eliran Kantor – artwork
 Dan Swanö – mixing, mastering
 Jacob Speis - layout
 Scott Kincade - photography
 Kristoff Bates - photography

References

Incantation (band) albums
Death metal albums
2020 albums
Relapse Records albums
Albums with cover art by Eliran Kantor